Standard Messenger is a weekly suburban newspaper in Adelaide, part of the Messenger Newspapers group. The Standard's area covers the inner-north of Adelaide's metropolitan area, from Collinswood in the south to Gepps Cross in the north.

The newspaper generally reports on events of interest in its distribution area, including the suburbs of Kilburn, Prospect, Hillcrest and Klemzig. It also covers the City of Prospect, Town of Walkerville and the City of Port Adelaide Enfield councils.

It has a circulation of 34,565 and a readership of 73,000.

History

The Standard became part of the Messenger stable in 1959 and was renamed the Standard Messenger in 1984.

References

External links
 Messenger Newspapers
 Standard Messenger

Newspapers published in Adelaide
Weekly newspapers published in Australia